Isaac Barinholtz (born February 18, 1977) is an American actor, comedian, writer, director, and producer. He is best known for his starring roles in the comedy series MADtv (2002–2007), Eastbound & Down (2012), The Mindy Project (2012–2017), Bless the Harts (2019–2021), and The Afterparty (2022).

Barinholtz also appeared in films, such as Disaster Movie (2008), Neighbors (2014), Neighbors 2: Sorority Rising (2016), Suicide Squad (2016), Snatched (2017), Blockers (2018), Late Night (2019), The Hunt (2020), and The Unbearable Weight of Massive Talent (2022). He co-wrote the action comedy film Central Intelligence (2016), and directed, wrote, produced, and starred in the comedy film The Oath (2018).

Early life, family and education
Barinholtz was born in the Rogers Park area of Chicago, Illinois, and was raised in its Lakeview neighborhood, the son of Peggy and Alan Barinholtz, an attorney. His brother Jon is also an actor, playing the recurring character Marcus on Superstore, and acted together with his brother in The Mindy Project. Barinholtz has described his parents as "liberal people with great senses of humor," and has said that he was raised in a "very funny home." Barinholtz is Jewish.

He attended Bernard Zell Anshe Emet Day School, then The Latin School of Chicago for high school.

He worked at a telemarketing company and as a busboy before starting a career in comedy.

Barinholtz attended Boston University. After dropping out of college, he worked for the Chicago Transit Authority before starting his comedy career. In a 2013 interview, he said he dropped out of school because he hated it and was doing poorly.

In a 2012 phone interview, Barinholtz said he was inspired to pursue a career in comedy after attending a comedy show at The Vic Theatre. Thereafter, he took comedy classes at The Second City, ImprovOlympic and Annoyance Theatre. He had planned on becoming a politician but decided to move to Los Angeles, California, to be an actor instead.

Career
Barinholtz spent two years in Amsterdam with the famed comedy troupe Boom Chicago, along with Jordan Peele, Josh Meyers and Nicole Parker. Barinholtz hosted the 'Worst of Boom Night' during a 10-year anniversary of the improv troupe Boom Chicago, where they performed their worst material from previous shows.

He has appeared in the films The Adventures of Big Handsome Guy and His Little Friend (2005), Love, Fear and Rabbits (2005) and Down (2001). Barinholtz currently lives in Los Angeles. Barinholtz is a founding member of The Lindbergh Babies, an improv group directed by Del Close, who worked with John Belushi, Bill Murray, Mike Myers and Chris Farley.

In 2012, Barinholtz joined the cast of the third season of the HBO series Eastbound & Down, playing the role of Ivan Dochenko, Kenny Powers' Russian rival.

He starred alongside Seth Rogen in the 2014 comedy Neighbors, as well as its 2016 sequel. Also in 2016, Barinholtz played prison guard Griggs in the DC Comics film Suicide Squad.

Barinholtz appeared in a regular role as nurse Morgan Tookers on the comedy series The Mindy Project. He was also a writer and story editor on the series. He also has a role in Friends from College, a Netflix original.

In 2022, Barinholtz was in the main cast of the Apple TV+ mystery comedy series The Afterparty.

In the 2022-2023 iteration of Celebrity Jeopardy! on ABC, he outlasted Patton Oswalt and Wil Wheaton to win the championship.  For this win, his charity Pacific Clinics received $1,000,000.

MADtv
Barinholtz officially joined the cast of MADtv in 2002 as a featured performer for the eighth season. He was later promoted to a repertory performer status the following season. Barinholtz would often pair up with fellow cast member Josh Meyers in various sketches for the eighth and ninth seasons similar to the Mike Myers/Dana Carvey and Jimmy Fallon/Horatio Sanz duos on Saturday Night Live. Barinholtz also paired up with fellow cast member Bobby Lee in some of his sketches in the later seasons. Some of his famous characters included Abercrombie & Fitch model Dutch and Principal Lankenstein from the Coach Hines sketches.

Barinholtz performs celebrity impressions, including Alex Trebek, Andy Dick, Arnold Schwarzenegger, Ashton Kutcher, Bo Bice, Dane Cook, Felicity Huffman, Fidel Castro, Howard Dean, Howie Long, Kevin Federline, Mark Wahlberg, Matt Damon, Nick Lachey, Nick Nolte, Pat Sajak, and Ralph Nader.

In 2007, he decided not to renew his contract for the 13th season of MADtv. His contract, like most other MADtv cast members, was for five seasons which was up for renewal at the conclusion of the show's 12th season. Barinholtz has commented that he started getting "restless" and did not see eye to eye with some of the MADtv bosses about how decisions were being made.

In 2009, he performed at the Chicago Improv Festival alongside former MADtv cast member Jordan Peele. In 2012, Barinholtz performed at another Chicago Improv Festival event with his brother, Jon.

He has frequently worked with comedian Dave Stassen, with whom he also went to high school. They co-wrote a SPIKE pilot in which Barinholtz also starred, Mega Winner, and the 2016 film Central Intelligence.

Characters

The Mindy Project
In 2012, Barinholtz began working as a writer on The Mindy Project and was cast as Nurse Morgan Tookers.

Personal life
Barinholtz is married to Erica Hanson, an accountant, with whom he has three daughters. His younger brother Jon Barinholtz played a recurring character in the NBC comedy Superstore.

Barinholtz was shooting his film Blockers when he suffered an accident during a fall stunt. The accident left him with two fractured cervical vertebrae in his neck.

Filmography

Film

Television

Video games

Audio

Awards and nominations

References

External links

Official MADtv site

1977 births
Male actors from Chicago
Jewish American male comedians
American male comedians
American male film actors
American impressionists (entertainers)
American male screenwriters
American male television actors
American television writers
Jewish American male actors
Jewish American writers
Latin School of Chicago alumni
Living people
21st-century American male actors
American sketch comedians
American male television writers
Comedians from Illinois
Screenwriters from Illinois
21st-century American comedians
21st-century American screenwriters
21st-century American male writers
21st-century American Jews